Dream Rockwell is a Canadian born public speaker, stage director, and event producer. She has worked in cirque, rock music, EDM shows, and concert tours. She specializes in interactive theatre as well as immersive events and festival production.

Rockwell is a female public speaker speaking on creating a new, more holistic reality. Past talks include TEDx Talks Vail, Leaders Causing Leaders, XLIVE, Burning Man, PPTOW, WORLDZ, Temple of Consciousness, One Love and many other conferences and festivals worldwide. Her subjects have included: Unleash Your Legend, YES AND...!, The Human Uplevel, Rise of the Feminine, Grace of Venus (her forthcoming book for young women) and Unraveling the Universe ~ Keys and Codes to the Matrix.

Rockwell is the founder and director of Lucent Dossier Experience, a "high-concept, steampunk-meets-neotribal", nouveau cirque circus troupe.

Rockwell is a co-founder of The Do Lab, an event production company responsible for the premier transformational music festival Lightning in a Bottle where she personally invited guests to her curated stages.

Rockwell debuted the Human Initiation Project at Burning Man 2018 in the PlayAlchemist Pyramid to a full capacity crowd over two nights. This event, sponsored by GT kombucha launched her new concept for human up-leveling based on the ancient technology of Initiates and rights of passage.

Rockwell's performance experience includes lead singer and vocals, circus arts, dance, aerial arts, fire performance, live original music, and vocals. She is also a music producer.

Early life and career

As a young woman, Rockwell lived in New York City, where she produced Lunatic Fringe, a monthly open mic poetry slam.

Rockwell later directed the performance portions of Panic! at the Disco's VH1 award-winning video "I Write Sins not Tragedies", as well as the international sold out concert tour that followed the video's success. She directed The Duhks' video "Fast Paced World", and Mötley Crüe's last world tour with Aerosmith

Personal life and philanthropy

Rockwell is the founder of Cuddle the World, an organization that takes teddy bears, cuddle blankets, inspirational toys and musical instruments to needy children around the world.

Rockwell is an adoptive parent and adopted a child in 2014.

Similar to Bill Clinton, Al Gore, James Cameron and more, Rockwell enjoys plant based diet and is keen on creating a cruelty-free world.

References

External links 
 http://www.laweekly.com/2009-04-23/la-vida/la-people-2009-lucent-dossier-the-new-vaudevillians/
 http://www.blackbookmag.com/article/la-qa-dream-rockwell-of-lucent-dossier/9464
 Lucent Dossier Experience official website
 The Do LaB article in LAist
 

American music video directors
American musical theatre directors
Artistic directors
Living people
Year of birth missing (living people)